Ole Einar Stavrum (born 22 May 1940) is a Norwegian footballer who played as a forward. He made in eight appearances for the Norway national team from 1964 to 1966.

References

External links
 

1940 births
Living people
Sportspeople from Kristiansund
Norwegian footballers
Association football forwards
Norway international footballers
Clausenengen FK players
Lyn Fotball players